PEO may stand for:

 Parking enforcement officer, an official who issues parking tickets
 Plasma electrolytic oxidation, a surface-treatment process for metals
 Polyethylene oxide, alternate name for Polyethylene glycol, a polymer
 Old Persian, ISO 639-2 and ISO 639-3 language code peo
 Pancyprian Federation of Labour, an umbrella organization for trade unions in Cyprus
 P.E.O. Sisterhood, an international women's organization with headquarters in North America
 Professional employer organization, a service provider of outsourced human resource management
 Professional Engineers Ontario, professional and regulatory organization for engineers in Ontario, Canada
 Program executive officer, an individual, civilian or military, responsible for large scale U.S. military acquisitions
 Programs Evaluation Office, a covert U.S. paramilitary mission in Laos in 1955-1962
 Progressive external ophthalmoplegia, alternate term for chronic progressive external ophthalmoplegia, an eye disorder

See also
Peo (disambiguation)